Kulzeb is a rural locality (a selo) in Kizilyurtovsky District, Republic of Dagestan, Russia. The population was 2,028 as of 2010. There are 19 streets.

Geography 
Kulzeb is located 17 km northwest of Kizilyurt (the district's administrative centre) by road. Novaya Chirkey and Stalskoye are the nearest rural localities.

Nationalities 
AVars, Laks, Dargins and Kumyks live there.

References 

Rural localities in Kizilyurtovsky District